Achinsky District is an administrative and municipal district (raion), one of the forty-three in Krasnoyarsk Krai, Russia. It is located in the southwest of the krai and borders with Bolsheuluysky District in the north, Kozulsky District in the east, Nazarovsky District in the south, and with Bogotolsky District in the west. Its administrative center is the city of Achinsk (which is not administratively a part of the district). Population:  14,904 (2002 Census);

Geography
The district is situated in the Chulym River valley and contains its tributaries.

History
The district was founded on April 4, 1924.

Administrative and municipal status
Within the framework of administrative divisions, Achinsky District is one of the forty-three in the krai. The city of Achinsk serves as its administrative center, despite being incorporated separately as a krai city—an administrative unit with the status equal to that of the districts. The district is divided into nine selsoviets.

As a municipal division, the district is incorporated as Achinsky Municipal District and is divided into nine rural settlements (corresponding to the administrative district's selsoviets). The krai city of Achinsk is incorporated separately from the district as Achinsk Urban Okrug.

Economy

Transportation
The Trans-Siberian Railway runs through the district territory from west to east. The Achinsk-Lesosibirsk branch runs in the north and the Achinsk-Abakan branch runs in the south.

References

Notes

Sources

Districts of Krasnoyarsk Krai
States and territories established in 1924